The Derby, Derbyshire, Nottingham and Nottinghamshire Local Enterprise Partnership (D2N2 LEP) is one of 39 Local Enterprise Partnerships set up by Government to drive economic development in England.

Established in May 2011, the LEP covers the geographical boundaries of the local authorities of the cities of Derby and Nottingham in the East Midlands including the counties of Derbyshire and Nottinghamshire. The LEP works to generate funding, projects and investment into the two counties.

In 2020, the council at Chesterfield was given the option to remain part of the Sheffield City Region or to relinquish its membership and rejoin the D2N2 LEP. It was decided they would rejoin the D2N2 and remain a non-constituent member of the Sheffield City Region.

The LEP covers the following areas of Derbyshire and Nottinghamshire:

Amber Valley
Ashfield District
Bassetlaw (Also a non-constituent member of the Sheffield City Region Combined Authority)
Bolsover (Also a non-constituent member of the Sheffield City Region Combined Authority)
Broxtowe
Chesterfield (Also a non-constituent member of the Sheffield City Region Combined Authority)
City of Derby
City of Nottingham
Derbyshire Dales (Also a non-constituent member of the Sheffield City Region Combined Authority)
Erewash
Gedling
High Peak
Mansfield District
Newark and Sherwood
North East Derbyshire (Also a non-constituent member of the Sheffield City Region Combined Authority)
Rushcliffe
South Derbyshire

All these settlements give the overall LEP population a total of nearly 1.9 million. The surrounding boroughs and districts around the LEP include East Staffordshire, Greater Manchester, South Yorkshire, Leicestershire, Lincolnshire, Cheshire, Staffordshire Moorlands, Warwickshire and Rutland.

References

 
 
 
 
 

Local enterprise partnerships
2011 establishments in England
Government agencies established in 2011
Economy of Derbyshire
Economy of Nottinghamshire